

National team

 Russia score given first
Key
 H = Home match
 A = Away match
 N = Neutral ground
 F = Friendly
 FT = Friendly tournament, 2013 Grand Prix de Futsal
 EC = 2014 European Futsal Championship

Super League

Regular season

Super League Playoffs

UEFA Futsal Cup

Eremenco Cup

Women's League
22nd Russian women futsal championship 2013/2014

Women's National Cup 
7-8 March 2014

References

Russia
Seasons in Russian futsal
futsal